Felben-Wellhausen railway station is a railway station in the Swiss canton of Thurgau and municipality of Felben-Wellhausen. The station is located on the Winterthur–Romanshorn railway line. It is an intermediate stop on Zurich S-Bahn services S24 and S30.

References 

Felben-Wellhausen
Felben-Wellhausen